Punta Beppe Tuccio Lighthouse is an active lighthouse located on the north eastern tip of the island of Linosa which makes part of the Pelagie Islands in the Channel of Sicily.

Description
The tower, the building and the lantern are white, the lantern dome is grey metallic. The lighthouse is completely automated and managed by the Marina Militare with the identification code number 3054 E.F.

See also
 List of lighthouses in Italy
 Pelagie Islands

References

External links
 Servizio Fari Marina Militare

Lighthouses in Italy
Buildings and structures in Sicily